College of Commerce, Arts & Science, Patna (est. 1949) also known as COCAS is a constituent unit of Patliputra University (earlier it was a unit of Magadh University). It has been re-accredited by NAAC with 'A' grade, receiving 3.10/4 CGPA. It is one of the oldest college of Patna. The college offers undergraduate and postgraduate courses in the fields of science, commerce and the arts.

History 
College of Commerce, Arts and Science was established in 1949 by Pt. Indu Shekhar Jha on the advise of Dr Rajendra Prasad, the first president of India, to impart quality education in the field of commerce and management in the state. The institution added the faculty of Science in 1957 followed by Arts in 1960 and Law in 1963. In 2016, the name 'College of Commerce, Patna' was changed to 'College of Commerce, Arts & Science'.

References 

1949 establishments in India
Universities and colleges in Patna
Educational institutions established in 1949
Constituent colleges of Patliputra University